Valle de los Cirios ("Valley of the Candles") is a wildlife protection area in the southern portion of the municipality of Ensenada in Baja California, Mexico. At  in area, it is the second-largest wildlife protection area behind El Vizcaíno Biosphere Reserve, but it includes more land than El Vizcaíno.

Geography
Valle de los Cirios is located in central Baja California. It covers a third of the area of the state of Baja California and half the territory of Ensenada municipality. Its southern border is the state line with Baja California Sur, where it adjoins El Vizcaíno Biosphere Reserve. The two protected areas together cover more area than the state of Quintana Roo. Valle de los Cirios borders the Pacific Ocean and Gulf of California

Ecology
It is characterized by scrub and desert landscapes featuring many cirio (Fouquieria columnaris) trees. The wildlife area is largely untouched and well-conserved, featuring a large number of endemic species including abundant concentrations of cacti, reptiles and large mammals.

The Peninsular Ranges extend north and south through the preserve. The western portion, between the mountains and the Pacific Ocean, is part of the Baja California Desert ecoregion. The narrower eastern portion, between the mountains and the Gulf of California, is part of the Gulf of California xeric scrub ecoregion.

Status
The site was declared a flora and fauna protection area on June 2, 1980. In June 2004, the Mexican government submitted Valle de los Cirios to the tentative list of sites that may become a World Heritage Site.

References

Protected areas of Baja California
Flora and fauna protection areas of Mexico
World Heritage Tentative List for Mexico